Nikil is a masculine given name. Notable people with this name include the following:

Nikil Dutt, Indian academic
Nikil Jayant (born 1945), Indian-American engineer
Nikil Saval, American journalist
Nikil Viswanathan (born 1987), American entrepreneur

See also

Masculine given names